Fredrik Jansson (born 20 September 1976) is a retired Swedish football defender.

References

1976 births
Living people
Swedish footballers
Örebro SK players
IK Brage players
Association football defenders
Allsvenskan players
Superettan players